AirBoss of America is a chemical and manufacturing company based in Toronto, Ontario, Canada. It was founded by Alan R. Burns in 1989, focusing on airless rubber treads for skid-steer loaders in the mining industry, which first hit the market in 1995.

The company was founded as IATCO Industries in 1989, changing its name to AirBoss in 1994.

The company and its subsidiaries have facilities in Kitchener, Ontario (purchased from ITRM in 1995), Scotland Neck, North Carolina (purchased in 2005), Auburn Hills, Michigan (through the purchase of Flexible Products, an automotive parts producer in 2013), and Acton Vale, Quebec (a winter boot factory, purchased from Acton Vale Co in 1999). By 1997 the company was producing 100 million pounds of rubber for industrial sales, and only using 10% of that to produce tires. The company sold the tire business, and also sold off the consumer footwear division of Acton Vale, keeping the military footwear and industrial supply divisions. The footwear expanded into gloves, gas masks, and firefighter boots.

Its original CEO was Bob Hagerman, from founding through 2013. Cofounder Gren Schoch took over as CEO at that time.

In April 2020, the company received a $96 million contract from FEMA for 100,000 powered air respirators as part of the COVID-19 pandemic response. The no-bid sole-source contract was pushed by Peter Navarro, part of the Trump presidency, and facilitated by retired general Jack Keane.

See also
 Dominion Tire Plant
 C-4 Protective Mask

References

External links
 Seeking Alpha: business report, 2017

Tire manufacturers of Canada
Canadian companies established in 1989
Manufacturing companies based in Toronto
Companies listed on the Toronto Stock Exchange
Manufacturing companies established in 1989